Old Boston may refer to:

 Old Boston, Pennsylvania, US
 Old Boston, Texas, US
 Old Boston Colliery, a disused colliery in Haydock, England